The 1906 Georgia Tech Yellow Jackets baseball team represented the Georgia Tech Yellow Jackets of the Georgia Institute of Technology in the 1906 college baseball season. Star players in 1906 included captain and outfielder Chip Robert, shortstop Tommy McMillan, and pitchers Ed Lafitte and Craig Day.

Schedule and results

References

Georgia Tech Golden Tornado
Georgia Tech Yellow Jackets baseball seasons
Southern Intercollegiate Athletic Association baseball champion seasons
Georgia Tech